The box, also known as a hot box or sweatbox, is a method of solitary confinement used in humid and arid regions as a method of punishment. Anyone placed in one would experience extreme heat, dehydration, heat exhaustion, or even death, depending on when and how long one was kept in the box. Another variation of this punishment is known as sweating, the use of a heated room to punish or coerce a person into cooperating with the torturers.

Use 
 The technique was used by prisons in the Southern United States until late in the 19th century and as punishment during times of slavery.
 The technique, then known as the "sweat box", was used in the Union Army during the American Civil War.
 The North Vietnamese Army used the technique at the infamous Hanoi Hilton.
 The CIA claims that the Chinese government has used "extreme heat" and "sweating" against dissidents.
 Use of a "sweatbox" has also been reported as a method of punishment in North Korean concentration camps, notably in Kang Chol-hwan's book The Aquariums of Pyongyang.
 In 2008, it was revealed that the U.S. military was detaining Iraqi prisoners in wooden crates, arousing concern of their use as hotboxes.
In 2009, Marcia Powell, a prisoner at Arizona State Prison Complex – Perryville, United States, died of heat exposure after being placed in an outdoor cage for four hours.
 The Tarrafal camp, in Cape Verde, used a small windowless shack as a form of torture against prisoners, most of them convicted of conspiring against Salazar's regime in Portugal.

Hot box torture has been portrayed in numerous films and television shows, including Leadbelly, Life, Life Is Beautiful, Cool Hand Luke, Stir Crazy, Take the Money and Run, Carbine Williams, The Longest Yard and its 2005 remake, Seven Days, The Bridge on the River Kwai, Von Ryan's Express, Prison Break, The X-Files, Oz, Firefly, Sullivan's Travels, My Name is Earl, The A-Team, Farscape, Burn Notice, Batman: The Animated Series, Bates Motel, Star Trek: Deep Space Nine, Django Unchained, Stranger Things (Season 4), 1923 (TV series) and Escape Plan. A parody of hot box torture was portrayed by a sandbox in Toy Story 3. Box torture was also used on Josh Groban in Muppets Most Wanted.

See also 
 Torture chamber
 Sensory deprivation
 Torture and the United States

References 

Penal imprisonment
Modern instruments of torture
Contemporary instruments of torture
Torture in the United States